Yuvraj Walmiki (born 29 November 1989) is an Indian professional Field Hockey Player from Maharashtra, also called as Prince of Indian Hockey. He was a member of the Indian team that won the 2011 Asian Champions Trophy. He also played world cup in 2014, in the Netherlands, (The Hague). Also he is the only Indian Player to have played German Hockey League for 8 years continuously. 
Also he is the first hockey player to have participated in (Fear Factor) Khatron Ke Khiladi season 7. He has received Shiv Chhatrapati Award Maharastra highest state sporting award, He was also a TEDx Speaker.

Yuvraj Walmiki has made acting debut with ALTBalaji Show "Class of 2020".

Career

1) Represented India in the year 2014 Rabobank Hockey World Cup in The Hague (Netherlands )

2) Played Pre World cup in The Hague (the Netherlands)

3) Played the Netherlands test series in Amsterdam in the year 2013 and won Gold Medal

4) Part of Champions Trophy in the year 2012 in Australia (Melbourne). Team entered semi finals after 30 years.

5) Bronze Medal - Sultan Azlan Shah Cup in the year 2012, Malaysia

6) Gold Medal - Olympic Qualifies in the year 2012, Delhi

7) Gold Medal - South Africa test series in Delhi in the year 2012

8)  Silver Medal - Tri-Series (India, Australia and Pakistan) in Australia in the year 2011

9) Participated in Lanco super series in Australia in the year 2011

10) Silver Medal - Champions challenge in South Africa in the year 2011

11) Gold Medal - Asian Champions Trophy in China in the year 2011

12) Silver Medal - Represented India in the South Asian Games in the year 2010 in Dhaka

13) Played for the Delhi Waveriders for the last 3 years. Won a Silver Medal season 1, Gold Medal in Season 2 and Bronze in Season 3

Achievements 
 First Indian Brand Ambassador for the Australian brand Ritual
 Brand Ambassador for Do Good Sports (NGO) in Mumbai
 Only Indian Player to play in German Hockey League for 4 years continuously
 Highest Goal scorer in German League for 2 years - 2010 and 2011
 Best Player in Mumbai Hockey League from the year 2004 to 2007

Hockey India League
In the auction of the inaugural Hockey India League, Walmiki was bought by the Delhi franchise for US$18,500 with his base price being US$9,250. The Delhi team was named Delhi Waveriders.

Currently Yuvraj  Walmiki has been retained by Delhi Waveriders for the season 2016/17 at the price of US$40,000.

References

External links
 Profile at Hockey India

1989 births
Living people
World Series Hockey players
Field hockey players from Maharashtra
Indian male field hockey players
Hockey India League players
Delhi Waveriders players
Fear Factor: Khatron Ke Khiladi participants
2014 Men's Hockey World Cup players